Terrance "Terry" Silver is a fictional character and the secondary antagonist of the Karate Kid media franchise, portrayed by actor and martial artist Thomas Ian Griffith. He serves as an antagonist in the film The Karate Kid Part III (1989) and the sequel television series Cobra Kai.

Roles 
He is the unseen overarching antagonist of The Karate Kid (1984), the main antagonist of The Karate Kid Part III (1989) and the secondary antagonist of the sequel television series Cobra Kai, serving as a mentioned character in Season 1, Season 2 and Season 3, and the main antagonist of Seasons 4 and 5.

Overview

Born to a wealthy family, Terry Silver joined the US Army sometime before 1968 and was deployed to Vietnam, where he met John Kreese, and the duo became best friends. Silver was given the nickname "Twig" by fellow squadmate Ponytail, because of his skinny stature. Kreese, Ponytail, and Silver are handpicked by Special Forces Captain Turner (Terry Serpico) to take part in covert missions and are trained in the art of Tang Soo Do karate. During one such mission to attack a North Vietnamese Army base, the unit is captured when Silver's radio crackles, leading to Ponytail being executed by their captors. While in captivity, an NVA officer chose Silver to participate in a forced hand-to-hand fight to the death with Turner, only for Kreese to volunteer himself instead. After being saved by an airstrike by the US Air Force, Kreese kills Turner and frees the remaining prisoners. Grateful to Kreese for saving his life, Silver pledged a lifetime debt to him. Silver's experiences in Vietnam left him struggling with posttraumatic stress disorder, and found his return to civilian life difficult. In honor of Ponytail, Silver grows a ponytail after leaving the military.

In 1975, Silver helps Kreese establish the Cobra Kai dojo. However, Silver was forced to help run his family's business at the insistence of his father, who threatened to cut him out of the family inheritance. Though he left Cobra Kai to Kreese, Silver continued to provide financial support and promised to help run the dojo one day. For the next decade, Silver relentlessly practiced karate, eventually turning into an expert in the sport and even exceeding Kreese in skill. Over time, he developed an increasingly erratic personality, aggravated in part by a cocaine addiction. In 1980, Silver was able to fully purchase Cobra Kai and proposed the dojo compete in a global tournament known as the Sekai Taikai, so that it would get worldwide recognition. Kreese declined the offer, hoping to focus on his students.

Terry Silver in the 1980s

By 1985, Silver is the head of a toxic waste disposal company called Dynatox Industries, which illegally dumps waste in the environment. By this time, the future of Cobra Kai is in doubt when all of Kreese's students leave after he attacked his star student Johnny Lawrence in retaliation for losing to Daniel LaRusso. When Kreese tells Silver he wants to shut down Cobra Kai, Silver vows to help him get revenge on Daniel and Mr. Miyagi and make Cobra Kai successful again. Silver sends Kreese to Tahiti to rest while he hires karate fighter Mike Barnes to defeat Daniel in the next All Valley Under-18 Karate Championships. Silver breaks into Mr. Miyagi's house to gather information on him and Daniel. He's nearly discovered but he hides inside the fireplace. He introduces himself to Daniel and Mr. Miyagi on a later day, claiming that he was sent to help Kreese regain balance. He lies to them saying that Kreese died of a cardiac arrest brought on by a broken heart and sadness at losing all of his karate students. He also blames Kreese's erratic behavior as a result of his years fighting in the Vietnam War. Silver "apologizes" to both Daniel and Mr. Miyagi on behalf of Kreese.

When Silver finds out that Daniel will not fight at the tournament this year, he orders Barnes and his two thugs, Snake and Dennis, to harass Daniel and coerce him into entering the tournament. After Daniel signs up for the tournament, he turns to Silver for guidance after Mr. Miyagi refuses to train him. Silver, acting on a request from Kreese to make Daniel's knuckles bleed, forces Daniel to destroy a wooden dummy. After Daniel finally destroys the dummy and injures himself at the same time, Silver tells him that he is ready for the tournament. When Daniel and his friend Jessica Andrews are at a nightclub, Silver bribes a man into provoking a fight with Daniel, who punches the man and breaks his nose. Realizing that he has become a different man and has alienated himself from his friends, Daniel informs Silver that he will not fight at the tournament. Silver reveals his true agenda and alliance with Barnes. As Daniel attempts to flee the dojo, Kreese reveals himself and Barnes attacks him. Mr. Miyagi then appears at the dojo to rescue Daniel, engaging Barnes, Kreese, and Silver in one-on-one fights. Though he puts up the strongest fight of the three, Silver is defeated by Miyagi, but continues to taunt him afterwards.

At the tournament, the committee organizers allow Silver to give a speech before the final match. Silver tells the audience that he will open a chain of Cobra Kai dojos where young people can learn "honesty, compassion, and fair play". When the fight begins, Silver and Kreese instruct Barnes to inflict pain on Daniel, by winning a point and subsequently losing a point to keep the score tied, leading to a sudden death round. The plan appears to work until Daniel unleashes his kata on Barnes during the sudden death round, defeating Barnes. After the final point is scored, Silver walks away in disgust as Cobra Kai shirts are discarded around him.

Contemporary Terry Silver

Season 1
Silver's, Kreese's, and Barnes's ruthless and unethical actions during the 1985 All-Valley Tournament led to the tournament committee issuing a lifetime ban on Cobra Kai from participating in the All-Valley. As he never met Silver or Barnes during his time as a student under Kreese, Johnny appeals the ban by acknowledging the problems of the previous Cobra Kai, promising that his new version of Cobra Kai is nothing like it and is dedicated to helping change kids' lives for the better. The committee agrees to reverse the ban, much to the chagrin of Daniel, who is also a member.

Season 2
Silver is seen in archival footage, when Daniel tells his students a brief synopsis of his time reluctantly training with Silver due to Mike Barnes forcing him to compete in the 1985 All-Valley Tournament to defend his championship title (from The Karate Kid Part III). After listening to Daniel's story of how his Cobra Kai membership and the Cobra Kai culture negatively affected his personality, Demetri and Robby reconcile with Chris, and Demetri and Chris work together to lift a rock back up.

Season 3
A young Silver is seen in flashbacks during the time when he and Kreese were soldiers in the Vietnam War. When they are both captured, a Vietnamese officer forces Silver to fight Captain Turner, However Kreese offers to fight Turner instead of Silver (who would certainly lose the fight). After Kreese defeats Turner, Silver expresses his gratitude towards Kreese and pledges his undying loyalty to him. In the present, Kreese picks up a photograph of himself, Silver, and their comrades in Vietnam. Remembering the promise Silver made to him, he calls him up asking for his help in taking on Johnny and Daniel, who have teamed up to train their students for the next All-Valley.

Season 4
Silver rejects Kreese's initial request for him to rejoin Cobra Kai and hangs up his phone call. When Kreese crashes a party at Silver's beach house, he tells him that Johnny and Daniel have joined forces. However, Silver still refuses to help and admits to being addicted to cocaine in the 1980s and realizes the absurdity of his plan to terrorize Daniel and Miyagi in 1985. He says that after the 1985 All-Valley Tournament, he hit rock bottom, lost his business and went into rehab and therapy to turn his life around. He is now in a relationship with Cheyenne Hamidi, whom he is helping to release a Mindfulness app and has made a living investing in firms. Silver has even gone so far as to remove his cobra tattoo on his ribcage to remove all traces of his association with Cobra Kai. 

However, Kreese's unexpected reappearance into Silver's life eventually causes him to regress back to his old ways. Remembering his promise to Kreese and convinced that he cannot escape his past, Silver abandons Cheyenne and agrees to return to Cobra Kai. However, Silver states that he wants to do things differently to avoid repeating their previous failure. Following a confrontation between Cobra Kai and Miyagi-do/Eagle Fang, Kreese and Silver visit Miyagi-do so that Silver can reintroduce himself to Daniel and Johnny and to reaffirm their agreement to halt hostilities before the tournament. Although Silver apologizes to Daniel for his past actions, Daniel forces the duo to leave as he remembers the ways in which Silver had deceived him. Insulted by Daniel's dismissiveness, Silver becomes more determined to win.

After a period of time training together at Cobra Kai, Kreese comes to believe that Silver is attempting to undermine him with conflicting lessons and by suggesting Kreese has a weakness during a lesson. When Kreese reprimands Silver, Silver attempts to prove his loyalty by purchasing numerous properties for Cobra Kai dojos for expansion, including their original dojo. He also uses Johnny's son and Cobra Kai student Robby Keene to lure him into a trap to brutalize him and demoralize Johnny's students, particularly Miguel Diaz. Kreese orders Silver to stop beating Johnny, and a bewildered Silver gets drunk and assaults Raymond "Stingray" Porter, a former adult Cobra Kai student desperate to rejoin after Kreese rejected him earlier.

During the tournament, Silver and Kreese give conflicting instructions to their students, straining their relationship further, though they eventually win the tournament after Tory Nichols defeats Samantha LaRusso in the female division. He later announces that Cobra Kai will be expanding as a franchise all across the Valley, while abandoning the original dojo, much to Kreese's dismay. However, after the tournament, unknown to everyone (sans Tory) Silver had paid off the referees into bribing the matches in Cobra Kai's favor. Later, while Silver and Kreese celebrate their victory at Silver's beach house, Silver proceeds to tell Kreese that his weakness is Johnny. A resentful Silver then admits his own weakness for Kreese by pledging a life debt to him and decides to do away with it by ending their friendship and having Kreese framed for attempted murder and aggravated assault, as Silver had coerced Stingray to frame Kreese for his beating under the condition he will be able to rejoin Cobra Kai. As Kreese is apprehended by the police, he furiously swears revenge on Silver, who tauntingly promises to recruit some "old friends" to teach at the new Cobra Kai dojos and to defeat Daniel and Johnny once and for all. With Kreese behind bars, Silver takes complete control of Cobra Kai for himself.

Season 5
Now in complete control of Cobra Kai, and with Kreese incarcerated, Silver begins expanding the dojo across the Valley. He buys out several local dojos while recruiting a group of new senseis from South Korea, including Kim Da-Eun, the granddaughter of Kim Sun-Yung who had created the style that had influenced Cobra Kai. Tory confronts Silver for bribing the referee at the All-Valley Tournament, but he maintains it was necessary to ensure Cobra Kai's success. Upon discovering that Daniel has recruited Chozen Toguchi and plots to take down Cobra Kai, Silver vows to retaliate. First, he has Mike Barnes' furniture store burned down when he attempts to help Daniel and Chozen find incriminating evidence against him. He then proceeds to form a rift between Daniel and Amanda, straining their marriage. When Daniel tries to get Stingray (who was bribed by Silver) to turn against him, Silver gets into a fight with Daniel, in which he seriously injures and demoralizes the latter, promising that the real pain is only beginning for him. Amanda eventually reconciles with Daniel after learning more of his history with Silver from her cousin Jessica Andrews who was around when Daniel had originally faced him and witnessed what kind of person Silver is. When Daniel and Johnny visit Kreese in prison, he reveals Silver's plan to get Cobra Kai into the Sekai Taikai, the most elite karate tournament in the world as part of his endgame for Cobra Kai to expand on a global scale. During the tournament round of the Sekai Taikai tryouts, Silver once again bribes the referee in Cobra Kai's favor and secretly teaches Kenny a illegal move to gain an advantage. Despite Cobra Kai winning the boys' round, Cobra Kai loses the girls' round after Tory abandons her match. Cobra Kai ultimately is let in, but Miyagi-Do and Eagle Fang also qualify.

Later, Terry and Kim have Tory punished for fleeing by making her use the 'Quicksilver' method on a stone dummy, making her right hand bleed (in a grim call-back to Silver training Daniel with a wooden dummy). Barnes, Chozen, and Johnny eventually decide to attack Silver by themselves, while the Eagle Fang and Miyagi-Do students, with help from Tory, hope to expose Silver to the Cobra Kai students by finding security footage of his assault on Stingray at the dojo, which Silver had covered his tracks by erasing. However, they manage to discover footage of Silver confessing to Tory about bribing the referee and upload it to the dojo's YouTube channel. In the ensuing fight at Silver's house, Barnes is knocked unconscious, with Johnny fighting off his henchmen, resulting in being pulverized until he rallies and defeats them with the help of a recovered Barnes, while Chozen defeats Silver in a fight to the death. However, while Chozen has his back turned, Silver heavily wounds him with a katana. Silver then makes his way to the dojo, but is too late to stop the footage of him and Tory's conversation being shown to his students. The revelation of the truth shakes Silver's students (and possibly Kim's) faith in him, causing him to go a manic spiral in front of everyone. Silver, still exhausted from his bout with Chozen, engages in a fight with Daniel who calls upon Silver's own training and finishes him off with a crane kick. Led by Kenny, the Cobra Kai students and Kim completely abandon Silver, throwing their Cobra Kai shirts on him while Stingray reverses his previous testimony to the police as he is taken away. With the evidence provided by both the students and Stingray, Silver faces a litany of criminal charges.

Commentary
John Kreese was initially intended to have a larger role in The Karate Kid III, but due to Martin Kove’s schedule conflicts with Hard Time on Planet Earth, the character of Terry Silver (Thomas Ian Griffith) was written into the script. The Karate Kid III was Griffith's first film. As a child, Griffith studied both acting and martial arts (Kenpo Karate and Tai Kwon Do), and prior to the film, he had performed on and off Broadway. Griffith states that when he was "cast for the Karate Kid role, my character wasn't supposed to do any martial arts at all...I just tortured Ralph, basically, and plotted his demise with Martin Kove". The narrative shifted after the fight choreographer learned of his background in martial arts. At the time he was cast, Griffith "figured the Terry Silver role was out of reach because he was 28 at the time and the character was a Vietnam War veteran about two decades his senior. And since Macchio, then 28, had to somehow play a convincing teenager, casting someone younger than him as Daniel's older antagonist seemed simply insane. Griffith presumed he had a better shot of being cast as "Bad Boy" Mike Barnes, a karate champion who fights La Russo in the climactic scene".

References

Film characters introduced in 1989
Fictional characters with post-traumatic stress disorder
Fictional martial arts trainers
Fictional male martial artists
Fictional prisoners of war
Fictional Vietnam War veterans
The Karate Kid (franchise) characters
Fictional karateka
Fictional Tang Soo Do practitioners
Male film villains
Martial artist characters in films
Martial artist characters in television
Fictional military personnel in films